Stuart Webbs was a fictional detective who appeared in a series of German films and serials during the silent era. Webbs was one of a number of detectives with English-sounding names to appear in German cinema of the era. Like his contemporaries such as Joe Deebs he was modeled on Sherlock Holmes. Webbs was the most popular of the group. His original film series ran from 1914 to 1926 and he continued to appear in other later films such as The Green Monocle (1929).

Webbs was played by Ernst Reicher until 1926. A number of figures directed entries in the series including Joe May, Johannes Guter and Robert Wiene. The series was originally made by Continental-Kunstfilm, but following a dispute May and Reicher left to form their own production company.

References

Bibliography 
 
 

Webbs, Stuart
Webbs, Stuart
German film series
Webbs, Stuart